Saurabh Kumar is an Indian diplomat currently serving as Ambassador of India to Myanmar. He was previously the Indian ambassador to the Islamic Republic of Iran.

Early life and education
Saurabh Kumar was born on 1 January 1966 in Lucknow, India. He completed his schooling from La Martinière College, Lucknow. An engineer by training, he obtained his B.Tech. from the Indian Institute of Technology Kanpur and M.Tech. from Indian Institute of Technology Delhi.

Career
Upon completing his education, he joined the Indian Foreign Service in 1989. His first post was to the Commission of India in Hong Kong in 1991.

Between 1993 and 1998 he served as an Under Secretary in the Ministry of External Affairs in New Delhi looking after China and Pakistan. He subsequently returned as Director of the China Desk in 2004 following stints as First Secretary in Indonesia (1998-2001) and Fiji (2001-2004). He became Deputy Chief of Mission to the Embassy of India in Beijing, China in 2007 and later became the Deputy Chief of Mission/chargé d'affaires to the Embassy of India in Rome, Italy between 2008 and 2012.

In 2012 he returned to New Delhi as Joint Secretary dealing with counter terrorism, policy planning, and research and subsequently joined the National Security Council Secretariat.

In 2015 he was appointed Ambassador of India to the Islamic Republic of Iran, a position he held until he assumed his current role of Ambassador of India to Myanmar in early 2019.

Personal life
He is married to Smriti Srivastav and has two daughters, Sugandha and Sanjana. He is fluent in English, Hindi, and has knowledge of Mandarin Chinese.

References

Ambassadors of India to Myanmar
Ambassadors of India to Iran
Indian Foreign Service officers
IIT Kanpur alumni
1966 births
Living people